General elections were held in Malta between 12 and 14 June 1971. The Malta Labour Party emerged as the largest party, winning 28 of the 55 seats.

Electoral system
The elections were held using the single transferable vote system, whilst the number of seats was increased from 50 to 55.

Results

References

General elections in Malta
General
Malta
Malta